Senecio velleioides, commonly known as forest groundsel, is a species of flowering plant in the family  Asteraceae.

The species occurs in the Australian states of New South Wales, Victoria and Tasmania.

References

velleioides
Asterales of Australia
Flora of New South Wales
Flora of Tasmania
Flora of Victoria (Australia)